Theobald Craschel (1511–1587) was a Roman Catholic prelate who served as Auxiliary Bishop of Cologne (1574–1587).

Biography
Theobald Craschel was born in Aachen, Germany in 1511. On 5 May 1574, he was appointed during the papacy of Pope Gregory XIII as Auxiliary Bishop of Cologne and Titular Bishop of Cyrene. On 8 Sep 1574, he was consecrated bishop by Johannes Kridt, Auxiliary Bishop of Münster. He served as Auxiliary Bishop of Cologne until his death on 31 Jul 1587.

References

External links and additional sources
 (for Chronology of Bishops) 
 (for Chronology of Bishops)  
 (for Chronology of Bishops) 
 (for Chronology of Bishops)  

16th-century German Roman Catholic bishops
Bishops appointed by Pope Gregory XIII
1511 births
1587 deaths